Waapasi is a 2013 Punjabi short film written and directed by Deepak Sharma and produced by Vertika Films. Starring Rohit Bharadwaj, the film is based on the strong clash of emotions that anyone away from home may go through. The story is about Hardeep, who left his home for Australia on student’s visa as he wanted to do something in his life and for his family. However, after a period of time he misses his family and decides to return to his loved ones. However, on his return he realises that his family is now habituate of his absence. The film was released online by Pocket Films on 21 June 2015.

Synopsis 
Hardeep left home for Australia on student’s visa. It was his dream to go to Australia and explore the world out there. He wanted to do something in his life and for his family. Now, it's been 5 years that Hardeep, who has now become Harry, is away from home. During this span in a foreign land, Hardeep did all odd jobs such as driving a taxi and working in a petrol pump. Going to college and attending classes was something he did for the sake of doing it.

Back home, there have been lot of changes in the lifestyle of Harry’s family after he left for Australia. Somewhere, they were initially dependent on the money sent by him and now are used to it. There is one more thing that they are used to, and that is Harry’s absence.

A stage comes when Harry realises that there is nothing worth for him in Australia, away from his family. Hence, he decides to return to his home and this time forever. But on his return he realises that he is now a guest in his family and not a member of who is being missed. His family and dear ones have made a mindset that he will be going back and they are used to his absence. They have expectations from him, which are dependent on his return.

Will Hardeep stay back home to become the member of his family or will he return like the guests do? Waapasi is the journey of Harry’s return.

Cast 
 Rohit Bharadwaj as Hardeep
 Dhirendra Gupta as Kishanchand (Father)
 Aruna Shetty as Sarla (Mother)
 N. K. Pant as Servant
 Moonis Khan as Surjeet (brother)
 Manisha Malhotra as Rano (sister)

Recognition 
Waapasi was screened at the Punjabi International Film Festival 2013 that was held in Toronto. The film was part of Cannes Film Festival 2014. It was also screened in the Shimla Film Festival (SFF) 2014, Nashik International Film Festival (NIFF) 2014 as well as Ma Boli Punjabi Film Festival that was held in Vancouver.

Awards and nominations
 2013 - Best Short Film – Jury Award at the 3rd Dada Saheb Film Festival 2013
 2013 - Best Actor Award (Rohit Bhardwaj) at the 3rd Dada Saheb Film Festival 2013 
 2014 - Best Director Award (Deepak Sharma) at the Noida International Film Festival 2014
 2014 - Best Film Award at the PGF Film Festival

References 

Gurpreet Kaur Chadha

2013 films
Punjabi-language Indian films
Indian short films